Several etymologies have been proposed for the word OK or okay.  The majority can be easily classified as false etymologies, or possibly folk etymologies. H. L. Mencken, in The American Language, lists serious candidates and "a few of the more picturesque or preposterous".  Allen Walker Read surveyed a variety of explanations in a 1964 article titled "The Folklore of 'O. K.'" Eric Partridge described O.K. as "an evergreen of the correspondence column."

References

Sources

Citations

OK
OK
Pseudolinguistics